McIntosh County Courthouse may refer to:

McIntosh County Courthouse (North Dakota), Ashley, North Dakota, listed on the National Register of Historic Places
McIntosh County Courthouse (Oklahoma), listed on the NRHP in McIntosh County, Oklahoma